Ruhwa (also spelt alternatively as Luhwa, Ruwa, or Luwa) is a town in north-western Burundi.

Location
The town is located in the Commune of Rugombo, in Cibitoke Province, in north-western Burundi, at the international border with the Republic of Rwanda. The coordinates of Ruhwa, Burundi are:2°43'51.0"S, 29°02'31.0"E (Latitude:-2.730833; Longitude:29.041944).

Population
The population of Ruhwa, Burundi is not publicly known as of August 2014.

Points of interest
The most important point of interest is the international border crossing between Burundi and Rwanda, along Highway RN5. The border crossing maintains a one-stop border stop.

See also

References

External links
 Ruhwa Micro Hydro Power Project

Populated places in Burundi